Ahmet Hadžipašić (1 June 1952 – 23 July 2008) was a Bosnian politician who served as the fifth Prime Minister of the Federation of Bosnia and Herzegovina from 14 February 2003 until 30 March 2007). He was a member of the Party of Democratic Action (SDA). Hadžipašić got his PhD in 1990 at the University of Zenica. He lived in Zenica, a city known as the metallurgy center of the former SFR Yugoslavia.

Hadžipašić died from a heart attack on 23 July 2008 in his home in Zenica. A few weeks before his death, Hadžipašić was elected for vice-rector of the University of Zenica. He was married to Branka Hadžipašić from 1974 until his death. Together, they had three daughters, Emina, Amra and Selma and, after his death, four grandchildren.

The Guardian wrote in his orbituary "As a newcomer to full-time politics, Hadžipašić, a chain-smoking "can-do" personality, appeared well-suited to the task of streamlining government finance, privatising state-run enterprises and attracting foreign investment."

References

1952 births
2008 deaths
People from Cazin
Bosniaks of Bosnia and Herzegovina
Bosnia and Herzegovina Muslims
Politicians of the Federation of Bosnia and Herzegovina
Party of Democratic Action politicians
Prime ministers of the Federation of Bosnia and Herzegovina